Max Cole is an American filmmaker.

Early life and career
Max Cole is a writer and director located in Los Angeles, California. He was born and raised in Pittsburgh, Pennsylvania. His latest short films have screened in 40+ film festivals across the country.

Cole is also the creator, host, and producer of The Cinema After Dark Podcast — a weekly independent film, television, and entertainment podcast.

Short films

References

External links 
 
 

Living people
African-American film directors
American film directors
African-American screenwriters
American screenwriters
American directors
Year of birth missing (living people)
21st-century African-American people